Chloe Watkins (born 7 March 1992) is an Ireland women's field hockey international. She was a member of the Ireland team that played in the 2018 Women's Hockey World Cup final. Watkins made her 200th senior international appearance for Ireland in the World Cup final. In addition to playing for UCD and Hermes-Monkstown in the Women's Irish Hockey League, Watkins has also played for Club de Campo in Spain and for HC Bloemendaal in the Netherlands. She has won league titles while playing in Ireland and Spain. She has also won senior cup competitions while playing in Ireland, Spain and the Netherlands.

Early years, family and education
Watkins is from Killiney in Dún Laoghaire–Rathdown. She is the daughter of Gordon and Pascal Watkins, nee Comer. Her mother is originally from Castlerea. The Watkins family have strong associations with Monkstown Hockey Club, serving in various capacities as players, coaches and officials. Her father Gordon and brother Gareth were also Ireland men's field hockey internationals. Her sister, Courtney, has played for Hermes-Monkstown in the Women's Irish Hockey League and the EuroHockey Club Champions Cup . Watkins was educated at St. Andrew's College and University College Dublin. In 2015 she graduated from UCD with a Bachelor of Commerce.

Domestic teams

St. Andrew's College
Watkins played field hockey for St. Andrew's College in a team that also included her older sister, Courtney and Gillian Pinder. She played in four Leinster Schoolgirls' Senior Cup finals, regularly playing against teams that included future Ireland team mates. In the 2006 final St. Andrew's defeated a Loreto, Beaufort team that included Hannah Matthews. 13-year-old Chloe Watkins scored St Andrew's second goal, with an assist from Courtney Watkins, in a 2–0 win. In the 2007 final, the Watkins sisters and Gillian Pinder lost 5–0 to an Alexandra College team that featured Nicola Evans. In the 2009 final St. Andrew's again faced Loreto, Beaufort and Hannah Matthews. This time St. Andrew's won 2–0 after extra time.  Courtney Watkins co-captained the team and scored the second goal. In the 2010 final Chloe Watkins captained St. Andrew's as they defeated an Alexandra College team that featured Deirdre Duke and Emily Beatty. Gillian Pinder scored the opening goal in a 2–0 win. In 2010 Chloe Watkins and Gillian Pinder were also members of the St. Andrew's College team that won the Kate Russell All-Ireland Schoolgirls Championship, defeating Coláiste Iognáid, Galway 3–1 in the final. On 10 September 2018, after their success at the Women's Hockey World Cup,  Watkins and Pinder returned to St. Andrew's to share their experience with the current students at St. Andrew's.

Hermes
In 2008, while still a 16-year-old schoolgirl at St. Andrew's College, Watkins, together with fellow schoolgirls, Anna O'Flanagan and Nicola Evans, was a member of the Hermes team that won the All-Ireland Ladies' Club Championships. In 2008–09 Watkins was a member of the Hermes team that finished as runners up in the inaugural Women's Irish Hockey League season. Other members of the team that included Anna O'Flanagan, Nicola Evans and Gillian Pinder. Deirdre Duke was also a team mate when Watkins played for Hermes.

UCD
Watkins began playing for UCD in 2010–11. She subsequently played for UCD in two successive Irish Senior Cup finals. In 2012, along with Dora Gorman, Anna O'Flanagan and Deirdre Duke, she was a member of the UCD team that defeated Loreto 3–2. UCD where finalists again in 2013 but this time Watkins finished on the losing side as they lost 3–2 to Railway Union. Watkins also helped UCD win the Chilean Cup. She also played for UCD in the 2015 EuroHockey Club Champions Cup, scoring in a 3–2 win against Canterbury Ladies.

Club de Campo
During the 2013–14 season, while on Erasmus, Watkins played for Club de Campo in the División de Honor Femenina de Hockey Hierba. Watkins scored on her league debut for the club and subsequently helped the club win a league and Copa de la Reina double.

Hermes-Monkstown
In 2015–16, together with Anna O'Flanagan and Nicola Evans, Watkins was a member of the Hermes team that won the Women's Irish Hockey League title and the EY Champions Trophy. In 2016 Hermes merged with Monkstown and the ladies team subsequently played as Hermes-Monkstown. Watkins subsequently played for Hermes-Monkstown in the 2017 EY Champions Trophy final and in the 2017 EuroHockey Club Champions Cup. On both occasions her team mates included her sister, Courtney.

HC Bloemendaal
Watkins, together with Anna O'Flanagan, spent the 2017–18 season playing for HC Bloemendaal in the Hoofdklasse in the Netherlands. They were coached by Teun de Nooijer and they helped Bloemendaal win the Gold Cup.

Monkstown
The 2018–19 season saw Watkins play for Monkstown in the new Division 2 of the Women's Irish Hockey League.

Ireland international
Watkins made her senior debut for Ireland, aged 18, in July 2010 against Scotland, just a couple of months after completing her Leaving Cert. In March 2015 Watkins was a member of the Ireland team that won a 2014–15 Women's FIH Hockey World League Round 2 tournament hosted in Dublin, defeating Canada in the final after a penalty shoot-out. She was also a member of the Ireland team that won the 2015 Women's EuroHockey Championship II, defeating the Czech Republic 5–0 in the final. In January 2017 she was also a member of the Ireland team that won a 2016–17 Women's FIH Hockey World League Round 2 tournament in Kuala Lumpur, defeating Malaysia 3–0 in the final.

Watkins represented Ireland at the 2018 Women's Hockey World Cup and was a prominent member of the team that won the silver medal. She featured in all of Ireland's games throughout the tournament, including the pool games against the United States, India, and England, the quarter-final against India, the semi-final against Spain and the final against the Netherlands. During the tournament Watkins scored twice in penalty shoot-outs. In the quarter-final against India she scored the winning penalty to send Ireland through to the semi-final. She also scored in the shoot out in the semi-final against Spain. In the final against the Netherlands, Watkins made her 200th senior international appearance for Ireland.

Honours
Ireland
Women's Hockey World Cup
Runners Up: 2018
Women's FIH Hockey World League
Winners: 2015 Dublin, 2017 Kuala Lumpur
Women's EuroHockey Championship II
Winners: 2015
Women's Hockey Champions Challenge I
Runners Up: 2014
Women's FIH Hockey Series
Runners Up: 2019 Banbridge
Women's Four Nations Cup
Runners Up: 2017
Women's Field Hockey Olympic Qualifier
Runners Up: 2012
UCD
Irish Senior Cup
Winners: 2011–12
Runners Up: 2012–13
Chilean Cup
Winners: 2011, 2013
Hermes/Hermes-Monkstown
Women's Irish Hockey League
Winners: 2015–16
Runners Up: 2008–09
EY Champions Trophy
Winners: 2015-16
Runners Up: 2016–17
All-Ireland Ladies' Club Championships
Winners: 2008
HC Bloemendaal
Gold Cup
Winners: 2017
Club de Campo
División de Honor Femenina de Hockey Hierba
Winners: 2013–14
Copa de la Reina de Hockey Hierba
Winners: 2013–14
St. Andrew's College
Leinster Schoolgirls' Senior Cup
Winners: 2005–06, 2008–09, 2009–10
Runners Up: 2006–07
Kate Russell All-Ireland Schoolgirls Championships
Winners: 2010

References

External links
 
 Chloe Watkins at Hockey Ireland

1992 births
Living people
Ireland international women's field hockey players
Women's Irish Hockey League players
UCD Ladies' Hockey Club players
Monkstown Hockey Club players
Club de Campo Villa de Madrid players
HC Bloemendaal players
Irish female field hockey players
Place of birth missing (living people)
Expatriate field hockey players
Irish expatriate sportspeople in the Netherlands
Female field hockey midfielders
People educated at St Andrew's College, Dublin
Alumni of University College Dublin
Sportspeople from Dún Laoghaire–Rathdown
Irish expatriate sportspeople in Spain
Field hockey players from County Dublin
Field hockey players at the 2020 Summer Olympics
Olympic field hockey players of Ireland